The National Security Space Institute (NSSI) is a unit in the United States Space Force's Space Training and Readiness Command (STARCOM). Headquartered at Peterson Space Force Base, Colorado, it provides space professional military education to the military space professionals in the United States and its allies.

NSSI's history can be traced back as far as 2001 when the Air Force Space Operations School was activated on 28 July 2001 under the Space Warfare Center (later redesignated as Space Innovation and Development Center) at Schriever Air Force Base, Colorado. On 2004, it was redesignated as the National Security Space Institute and realigned under the Air Force Space Command and was subsequently transferred to its current location at Peterson Air Force Base. In 2009, it was realigned under Air Education and Training Command and remained there under various units in its Air University until 2020 when it was transferred to the Space Force to form part of the initial structure of STAR Delta (P). In August 2021, STAR Delta (P) was stood up as the USSF's third field command and given the name Space Training and Readiness Command (STARCOM).

In 2019, it established three new courses: Space 100, Space 200, and Space 300. It also started accepting participation of foreign nationals from coalition partners of the United States, an initiative of former Secretary of the Air Force Heather A. Wilson. Since 2019, the NSSI has grown from offering three courses to sixteen organized under two colleges: the College of Space Warfare and the College of Professional Development. The institute now serves more than 50 allied and friendly partners from across the globe.

Organization

College of Professional Development
 Introduction to Space
 Space 100
 Space 200
 Space 300
 Space Executive Course
 Space Capstone Publication Course
 Guardian Orientation Course

College of Space Warfare
 Joint Space Planners Course
 Joint Integrated Space Team Course
 Coalition Space 
 Space Intelligence Fundamentals 
 Space Familiarization
 Fundamentals of Orbital Operations
 Concepts of Orbital Warfare
 Fundamental Application of Space Targeting
 Joint Space Targeting

History

Lineage 
 Constituted as United States Air Force Space Operations School on 15 June 2001
 Activated on 28 July 2001
 Redesignated as National Security Space Institute on 1 October 2004

Assignments 
 Space Warfare Center, 28 June 2001
 595th Space Group, 23 October 2002
 Air Force Space Command, 1 October 2004
 Air Education and Training Command, 1 October 2009
 Ira C. Eaker Center for Professional Development, 23 October 2009
 Air Force Institute of Technology, 1 April 2016
 Space Training and Readiness Delta (Provisional), 24 July 2020
 Space Training and Readiness Command, 23 August 2021

List of commandants 
 Lt Col Frank Gallagher, 9 July 2004
 Col David L. Jones, 22 June 2006
 Col Robert Gibson, 31 August 2008
 Col Samuel H. Epperson Jr., 6 January 2011
 Col James Forand, 24 June 2014
 Col Richard B. Van Hook, 26 May 2015
 Col Max E. Lantz, 11 January 2019
 Col Kenneth F. L. Klock, 21 July 2022

See also 
 Space Training and Readiness Command
 Space Delta 13

References

External links 
 

Military education and training in the United States
Squadrons of the United States Space Force